The Men's Individual Time Trial at the 2002 UCI Road World Championships was the 9th edition of the event. The race took place on 11 October 2002 in Zolder, Belgium. The race was won by Santiago Botero of Colombia.

Final classification

References

Men's Time Trial
UCI Road World Championships – Men's time trial